The 122nd Overseas Battalion, CEF was a unit in the Canadian Expeditionary Force during the First World War.  Based in Huntsville, Ontario & Bracebridge, Ontario  the unit began recruiting in late 1915 in the Muskoka district.  After sailing to England in June 1917, the battalion was absorbed into the Canadian Forestry Depot on June 9, 1917.  The 122nd Battalion, CEF had one Officer Commanding: Lieut-Col.D. M. Grant.

The Battalion had 4 different versions of their cap badge.

Battalion Colours

References
Meek, John F. Over the Top! The Canadian Infantry in the First World War. Orangeville, Ont.: The Author, 1971.

Algonquin Regiment (Northern Pioneers)
Battalions of the Canadian Expeditionary Force
Huntsville, Ontario